Marquess Grey was a title in the Peerage of Great Britain. It was created on 19 May 1740 for Henry Grey, 1st Duke of Kent, with remainder to the male issue of his body and in default thereof to his granddaughter, the Honourable Jemima Campbell, and the heirs male of her body. The Duke of Kent died only two weeks after the creation of the marquessate, at which point the dukedom and most of its subsidiary titles became extinct (see Duke of Kent).

He was succeeded in the barony of Lucas (which could be passed on through female lines) and in the marquessate of Grey according to the special remainder by his granddaughter Jemima, who became the second Marchioness Grey. She was the daughter of John Campbell, Lord Glenorchy, later 3rd Earl of Breadalbane and Holland, and Lady Amabel Grey (died 1726), eldest daughter of the Duke of Kent. On 22 May 1740, three days after the marquessate was created, she married the Honourable Philip Yorke, later 2nd Earl of Hardwicke. They had two daughters, Lady Amabel Yorke and Lady Mary Yorke.

Lady Grey died in January 1797, aged 73. As she had no sons, the marquessate died with her. However, she was succeeded in the barony of Lucas by her elder daughter, Lady Amabel, who in 1816 was created Countess de Grey in her own right (see Earl de Grey for further history of this title).

Marquesses Grey (1740)
Henry Grey, 1st Duke of Kent, 1st Marquess Grey (1671–1740)
Jemima Yorke, 2nd Marchioness Grey (1722–1797)

See also
Duke of Kent
Earl de Grey
Baron Lucas

References

Extinct marquessates in the Peerage of Great Britain
Peerages created with special remainders
Noble titles created in 1740